Lucas Nathan Veloso (born 17 November 1998), known as Lucas Nathan or just Nathan, is a Brazilian footballer who plays as an attacking midfielder for Portuguesa, on loan from Caldense.

Club career
Born in Jundiaí, São Paulo, Lucas Nathan represented SEV Hortolândia, Bragantino and Red Bull Brasil as a youth. He made his senior debut with the latter in the 2018 Copa Paulista, scoring once in ten appearances.

Lucas Nathan moved to Grêmio Osasco ahead of the 2019 season, but was presented at Caldense on 4 April of that year. Despite spending the 2019 Série D without a single appearance, he became a regular starter in the 2020 campaign.

On 3 March 2021, Lucas Nathan joined Coritiba on loan until the end of the year, with a buyout clause. On 7 July, after being rarely used, he moved to Ituano also in a temporary deal, and helped the club in their 2021 Série C winning campaign.

On 2 December 2022, still owned by Caldense, Lucas Nathan was announced at Portuguesa.

Career statistics

Honours

Club
Ituano
Campeonato Brasileiro Série C: 2021

References

1998 births
Living people
People from Jundiaí
Footballers from São Paulo (state)
Brazilian footballers
Association football midfielders
Campeonato Brasileiro Série B players
Campeonato Brasileiro Série C players
Campeonato Brasileiro Série D players
Red Bull Brasil players
Grêmio Esportivo Osasco players
Associação Atlética Caldense players
Coritiba Foot Ball Club players
Ituano FC players
Associação Portuguesa de Desportos players